The East Sequoia League is a high school athletic league that is part of the CIF Central Section.

Original members of the East Sequoia League include Orosi, Exeter, Coalinga, Immanuel, Dinuba, Lindsay, Woodlake, and Corcoran high schools.

In 2006, Dinuba, Exeter, Immanuel, and Coalinga left the league and joined the new Central Sequoia League. Central Valley Christian and Parlier joined the ESL.

Central Valley Christian left the league in 2008 and was added to the Central Sequoia League

Orosi left the league in 2012 to join the East Sierra League. Granite Hills left the East Yosemite league and joined the ESL along with Sierra Pacific.

In 2018, Farmersville joined the league after the East Sierra League retired.

Members
 Corcoran High School
Farmersville High School (California) 
Granite Hills High School (Porterville, California) 
Lindsay High School
Orange Cove High School
Orosi High School
Strathmore High School
Summit Charter Prep School
Wonderful College Prep Academy
Woodlake High School

References

CIF Central Section